Essisus is a genus of longhorn beetles of the subfamily Lamiinae, containing the following species:

 Essisus dispar Pascoe, 1866
 Essisus vivesi Breuning, 1978

References

Desmiphorini